Poniatów  is a village in the administrative district of Gmina Bystrzyca Kłodzka, within Kłodzko County, Lower Silesian Voivodeship, in south-western Poland, near the border with the Czech Republic. Prior to 1945 it was in Germany.

The village has a population of 3.

References

Villages in Kłodzko County